Jazz Message #2 (also released as Hard Bop and The Jazz Message of Hank Mobley Volume 2) is an album by jazz saxophonist Hank Mobley released on the Savoy label in 1957. It was recorded on July 23 & November 7, 1956 and features performances by Mobley, Donald Byrd, Lee Morgan, Hank Jones, Doug Watkins Barry Harris, Kenny Clarke and Art Taylor. Lee Morgan was very young in this recording (18 years old).

Track listing 
All compositions by Hank Mobley except as indicated

 "Thad's Blues" (Thad Jones) - 9:48
 "Doug's Minor B' Ok" (Watkins) - 6:40
 "B. for B.B." - 6:31
 "Blues Number Two" - 5:00
 "Space Flight" - 4:15

Recorded on July 23 (3-5) and November 7, 1956 (1-2).

Personnel 
Tracks 1, 2
 Hank Mobley - tenor saxophone
 Lee Morgan - trumpet
 Hank Jones - piano
 Doug Watkins - bass
 Art Taylor - drums

Tracks 3-5
 Hank Mobley - tenor saxophone
 Donald Byrd - trumpet
 Barry Harris - piano
 Doug Watkins - bass
 Kenny Clarke - drums

References

Hard bop albums
Hank Mobley albums
1957 albums
Savoy Records albums
Albums recorded at Van Gelder Studio